Louis-Henri Murger, also known as Henri Murger and Henry Murger (27 March 1822 – 28 January 1861), was a French novelist and poet.

He is chiefly distinguished as the author of the 1847-1849 book Scènes de la vie de bohème (Scenes of Bohemian Life), which is based on his own experiences as a desperately poor writer living in a Parisian garret (the top floor of buildings, where artists often lived) and as a member of a loose club of friends who called themselves "the water drinkers" (because they were too poor to afford wine). In his writing he combines instinct with pathos, humour, and sadness. The book is the basis for the 1896 opera La bohème by Puccini, Leoncavallo's opera of the same name, and, at greater removes, the zarzuela Bohemios (Amadeu Vives), the 1930 operetta Das Veilchen vom Montmartre (Kálmán), and the 1996 Broadway musical Rent. He wrote lyrics as well as novels and stories, the chief being La Chanson de Musette, "a tear," says Gautier, "which has become a pearl of poetry".

Biography
Murger was born and died in Paris.  He was the son of a Savoyard immigrant who worked as a tailor and janitor for an apartment building in the Rue Saint Georges. He had a scanty and fragmented education. After leaving school at 15 he worked in a variety of menial jobs before securing one in a lawyer's office. While there he also wrote poetry which came to the attention of the French writer Étienne de Jouy. De Jouy's connections enabled him to secure the position of secretary to Count Tolstoi, a Russian nobleman living in Paris. Murger's literary career began about 1841. His first essays were mainly literary and poetic, but under the pressure of earning a living he wrote whatever he could find a market for, turning out prose as he put it, "at the rate of eighty francs an acre". At one point he edited a fashion newspaper, Le Moniteur de la Mode, and a paper for the millinery trade, Le Castor.  His position gradually improved when the French writer Champfleury, with whom he lived for a time, urged Murger to devote himself to fiction. His first big success was Scènes de la vie de bohème. In 1851 Murger published a sequel, Scènes de la vie de jeunesse. Several more works followed, but none of them brought him the same popular acclaim.

He lived much of the next ten years in a country house outside Paris, dogged by financial problems and recurrent ill health. In 1859 he received the Légion d'honneur but within two years he was almost penniless and dying in a Paris hospital. Napoleon III's minister Count Walewski sent 500 francs to help pay his medical expenses, but it was too late. Henri Murger died on 28 January 1861 at the age of 38. The French government paid for his funeral, which from contemporary accounts in Le Figaro was a great public occasion attended by 250 luminaries from journalism, literature, theatre, and the arts. Le Figaro also started a fund to raise money for his monument. Hundreds of people contributed and within two months it had raised over 6500 francs.

Spelling of the name

Early in his career, in an effort to make himself appear more "elegant and noticeable", Murger signed his name as "Henry Mürger", the English-looking "y" and German-looking umlaut both being exotic in French. - though the spelling of Henry rather than Henri was also archaic French, having been standard orthography (along with such spellings as loy and roy) prior to c. 1775 and not totally supplanted by "i" until after 1790. After experimenting with other variations he eventually kept the former but dropped the latter, so that all of his best-known works were published under the name "Henry Murger".

Works

 Scènes de la vie de bohème (1847–49).
 Scènes de la vie de jeunesse (1851).
 Le Pays latin (1851).
 Propos de ville et propos de théâtre (1853).
 Scènes de campagne (1854).
 Le Roman de toutes les femmes (1854).
 Ballades et Fantaisies (1854).
 Les Buveurs d'eau (1854).
 Le Dessous du panier (1855).
 Le Dernier rendez-vous (1856).
 Les Nuits d’hiver (1856).
 Les Vacances de Camille (1857).
 Le Sabot rouge (1860).
 Madame Olympe (1860).

In English translation
 The Bohemians of the Latin Quarter (1888).
 Winter Nights (1923).

References

Bibliography
Seigel, Jerrold (1999) Bohemian Paris: Culture, Politics, and the Boundaries of Bourgeois Life, 1830-1930, JHU Press.

Further reading

 Baldick, Robert (1961). The First Bohemian: The Life of Henry Murger. London: Hamish Hamilton.
 Besant, Walter (1893). "Henry Murger." In: Essays and Historiettes. London: Chatto & Windus, pp. 170–196.
 Gauthier, Théophile (1901). "Henry Murger." In: Portraits of the Day. Cambridge: The Jenson Society, pp. 138–147.
  Lelioux, Adrien François; Noël, Léon; and Nadar (1862). Histoire de Mürger: pour a l'histoire de la vraie Bohéme, par Trois Buveurs d'Eau, Paris: Collection Hetzel; includes unpublished letters and verses by Murger.
 Mauris, Maurice (1880). "Henri Murger." In: French Men of Letters. New York: D. Appleton and Company, pp. 89–108.
 McCarthy, Justin (1868). "The Bohemia of Henri Mürger." In: "Con Amore", or Critical Chapters. London: Tinsley Brothers, pp. 208–249.
 Montorgueil, Georges (1928). Henri Murger, Romancier de la Bohème. Paris: Grasset.
 Moss, Arthur, and Evalyn Marve (1947). The Legend of the Latin Quarter: Henry Mürger and the Birth of Bohemia. London: W.H. Allen & Co..
 Samuels, Maurice (2004). "Introduction." In: The Bohemians of the Latin Quarter.  Philadelphia: University of Pennsylvania Press, pp. vii-xvi.
 Saintsbury, George (1891). "Henry Murger." In: Essays on French Novelists. London: Percival & Co., pp. 381–418.
 Williams, Orlo (1913). Vie de Bohème, a patch of romantic Paris, Boston: R. G. Badger.

External links

 
 
 
 Scènes de la vie de bohème, Romagnol French edition of 1902 illustrated with etchings by  after watercolors by Charles Léandre, at Gallica Digital Library.

1822 births
1861 deaths
Writers from Paris
French poets
Burials at Montmartre Cemetery
French people of German descent
French people of Austrian descent
19th-century French novelists
French male poets
French male novelists
19th-century poets
19th-century French male writers